, son of Nijō Michihira and adopted son of regent Michinori, was a kugyō or Japanese court noble of the Muromachi period (1336–1573). He held a regent position kampaku from 1358 to 1361.

Family
 Father: Nijō Michihira 
 Foster Father: Kujō Michinori
 Foster Mother: Oomiya Suehira’s daughter
 Wives and children:
 Wife: Sanjo Sanetada’s daughter
 Kujō Tadamoto
 Wife: Reizei Sadachika’s daughter
 Kujo Noritsugu (1362-1404)
 Wife: Shakunyo‘s daughter
 Kyōkaku (1395-1473)
 unknown:
 Kujō Mitsuie
 Dōson
 Koen (1378-1410)
 Jinku（?-1415）

References
 

1331 births
1400 deaths
Fujiwara clan
Kujō family